The National Premier League Queensland, run by Football Queensland, is the top tier state-level football (soccer) competition in Queensland. The conference is a sub division of the National Premier Leagues. The inaugural season kicked off in March 2013 and consisted of 12 teams. Each team will be expected to field a senior team, five junior men's teams from under-12 to under-20 starting in 2013 and women's junior teams in under-13, under-15, and under-17 starting in 2014.

Each club has been granted a 5-year licence and there is no promotion or relegation from the league during this period. It was announced on 16 December 2016 that there would be promotion and relegation to the Football Queensland Premier League (FQPL) as of the 2018 season and that the league would be expanded to 14 teams. This announcement came with the addition of the Football Queensland Premier League, a new tier immediately below the National Premier League.

Peninsula Power and Eastern Suburbs were the first two teams promoted to the NPL from the FQPL for the 2019 season. No teams were relegated in 2018.

History
The league directly replaced the existing Queensland State League, as part of the wider introduction of the National Premier Leagues into several states in 2013.

The league commenced with 12 teams in its inaugural 2013 season.  This was increased to 14 teams in the 2014 season with the inclusion of Harimau Muda A, Southwestern Queensland and the replacement of the QAS team with the Brisbane Roar National Youth League side. However, the teams were controversially reduced to 13 mid-season, due to CQFC Energy's failure to meet licensing conditions.

Format
The season consists of a regular season in which all clubs play each other twice, home and away.  At the conclusion of the regular season the top of the table club progresses onto the NPL National Finals Series to play against the champions from other NPL subdivisions.  Also at the conclusion of the regular season the top four clubs play a local finals series.  The local finals series consists of two semi-finals and a final.  In the local finals series the top of the ladder club plays the fourth place and second place plays third.  The winner of these local semi finals play each other in the NPL Qld Grand Final.

Clubs

Current clubs (2023)

Former clubs

Honours

See also
National Premier Leagues
Football Queensland Premier League
Brisbane Premier League

Notes

References

Summer association football leagues
1
Sports leagues established in 2012
2012 establishments in Australia
Recurring sporting events established in 2012
National Premier Leagues